Dave Raoul Ntamak, known professionally as Dave Sutter (born February 21, 1992) is a professional Cameroonian-born Swiss professional ice hockey defenseman, currently playing for HC Fribourg-Gottéron in the National League.

Playing career
Sutter was born in Douala, Cameroon as Dave Raoul Ntamak, spending the first four years of his life in the country before moving to Switzerland with his mother. He adopted the surname Sutter professionally, as a way to honor his stepfather who introduced him to the sport of ice hockey at the age of nine.

Career statistics

Regular season and playoffs

International

References

External links

1992 births
Living people
Black ice hockey players
Cameroonian expatriate sportspeople in Switzerland
Cameroonian expatriate sportspeople in the United States
EHC Biel players
Genève-Servette HC players
HC La Chaux-de-Fonds players
HC Fribourg-Gottéron players
People from Monthey
Seattle Thunderbirds players
Sportspeople from Douala
Swiss ice hockey defencemen
Swiss people of Cameroonian descent
Swiss sportspeople of African descent
Swiss expatriate sportspeople in the United States
ZSC Lions players
Expatriate ice hockey players in the United States
Swiss expatriate ice hockey people